Oyanish is a studio album by the Alim Qasimov and Coldünya. The album contains five compositions based on mugham and Azerbaijani rock.

Track listing

See also
Mugham
Meykhana

References 

2003 classical albums
Alim Qasimov albums
Coldünya albums